Bajiquan is a Chinese martial art that features explosive, short-range power and is famous for its elbow and shoulder strikes. Its full name is kaimen ba ji quan.

Bajiquan is now popular in northern China and Taiwan. Later, it was introduced to Japan, South Korea and other countries, such as the United States, Canada, Britain, France, Italy among others.

Etymology 

Baji quan was originally called bazi quan ( or ) or "rake fist" because the fists, held loosely and slightly open, are used to strike downwards in a rake-like fashion. The name was considered to be rather crude in its native tongue, so it was changed to baji quan. The term baji comes from the Chinese classic, the Yijing (I-Ching), and signifies an “extension of all directions”. In this case, it means “including everything” or “the universe”.

History 
Little is known about the origin of the style. Information before the Republican era of China is extremely rare, with clearest documentation begging circa 1920s-1930s.

The first practitioner clearly identified in written history was a man named Wu Zhong (吴钟, wú zhōng，1712-1802), a member of the Hui minority and from the Wu family clan of the Mengcun (孟村) region of Cangzhou, Hebei.

According to the genealogical records of the Wu family, Wu Zhong's great-grandfather left the family stronghold to settle about 50 km away in the isolated hamlet of HouZhuangKe (后庄科) in the neighboring province of ShanDong. Wu Zhong is said to have been born in HouZhuangKe before returning to settle with the main branch of his family in the village of Mengcun (孟村), Hebei province. Little is known of Wu Zhong, except that he quickly reached an unparalleled level in the practice of martial arts. His prowess earned him the nickname "god of the spear", as well as being recruited to serve as an instructor at the imperial court under Prince Yun-ti. When he was about 60 years old, Wu Zhong returned to Mengcun where he devoted the last thirty years of his life to transmitting his fighting art, and the village became the source of the development of Baji Quan.

The origin of the mastery acquired by Wu Zhong remains unknown to this day, it is currently the subject of many controversies between the different branches of Baji Quan. Historical documents contain two versions of the origins of Bajiquan:
  The Cang County annals, the Baji manual of the Wu family, and the Pobei manuscript indicate that an itinerant Taoist monk by the name of Lai (癞, lài, "the leper") and his disciple Pi (癖, pǐ , “the enthusiast”) would have stayed in Mengcun to teach Baji Quan as well as the handling of the great spear to Wu Zhong. By the admission of the Wu family of Mengcun, this reference is probably to be considered as a legend.; 
  The other is Zhang Yueshan, a monk from Yueshan Temple  (岳山寺) in Henan Province (either Zhengzhou or Jiaozuo), who was returning to secular life and traveling around. It is said that he taught the great spear method.
 Besides those two theories, there is also speculation that the martial art originates from Shaolin Temple in Henan, unrelated to Zhang Yueshan.

In any case, all sources agree on the fact that Wu Zhong traveled a lot, and that it was only at the end of his life that he devoted himself to teaching Baji Quan. It is presumed that the legend of Lai and Pi simply symbolizes the martial knowledge that Wu Zhong was able to acquire throughout his life, probably from the study of the other styles of the region, and that he crystalized it in the form of Baji Quan.

In addition, the ancient name of Bajiquan is believed to have been written as Bǎzi quán, with the first historical reference to Baji quan appears in military treaty called "Jixiao Xin Shu" (纪效新书) written by general Qi Ji-guang (戚继光, 1528 - 1588). It is inferred that Bajiquan may have been a well-established martial art during the 16th Century. It is postulated that the martial art's name was Bǎzi quán, and that it was later changed to Bajiquan by Wu Zhong. However, this information is contested by some.

Wu Zhong had only one child, his daughter Wu Rong (吴荣, wú róng), who at the age of 30 married an expert in Changquan and stopped practicing Baji Quan after a few years. To avoid remaining childless and ensure the continuity of his art, Wu Zhong adopted Wu Ying (吴溁, wú yíng), a distant nephew of the Wu family of Mengcun. Wu Zhong transmitted all his knowledge to Wu Ying, as well as to Wu Zhong Yu (吴钟毓), another distant nephew of the Wu family of Mengcun. In 1790, at the request of his master, Wu Ying officially introduced the name "Baji Quan" and he wrote the first martial manual of the Wu family to ensure the transmission of the family art among generations to come. Thus, the Baji Quan was transmitted within the Wu family who also ensured the dissemination of the style to other families in Mengcun and the surrounding villages.

At first, Bajiquan was transmitted mainly to the Hui people of Meng Village, but it was also transmitted to Luohan, an area where many Han people live. Eventually, it came to be divided into the Hui lineage of Mencun and the Han lineage of Luo.

Contemporary History of Baji Quan
Li Shuwen (1860-1934) was considered one of the most important movers of the martial art during Qing Dynasty. He was from Cangzhou, Hebei, and acquired the nickname "God of Spear Li". A Beijing opera Wu Shen (martial male character) by training, he was also an expert fighter. His most famous quote is, "I do not know what it's like to hit a man twice." Li Shuwen's students included Huo Dian Ge (bodyguard to Pu Yi, the last Emperor of China), Li Chenwu (bodyguard to Mao Zedong), and Liu Yunqiao (secret agent for the nationalist Kuomintang and instructor of the Chiang Kai-shek's bodyguards). Baji quan has since acquired a reputation as the "bodyguard style". Ma Feng Tu and Ma Yin Tu introduced baji into the Central Guoshu Institute (Nanjing Guoshu Guan ) where it is required for all students.

The impetus that set  the spread of bajiquan throughout China was that of the Central Guoshu Institute, as a regular course common to the two training courses "Shaolin Gate" and "Wudang Gate". It all started with the establishment of Bajiquan teaching materials for group training (団体訓練用八極拳教材). As the branch of Central Guoshu Institute expanded, Bajiquan became more popular and popularized.

Relation to Piguazhang
In the tradition of Ma brothers, Bajiquan is believed to share roots with another Hebei martial art, Piguazhang. It is said that Wu Zhong, the oldest traceable master in the baji lineage, taught both arts together as an integrated fighting system. The legend has it that they eventually split apart, only to be recombined by Li Shuwen in the late 18th to early 19th century. As a testament to the complementary nature of these two styles, a proverb states: "When pigua is added to baji, gods and demons will all be terrified. When baji is added to pigua, heroes will sigh knowing they are no match against it."

Branches and lineages 
Prominent branches and lineages of the art survived to modern times, including Han family Baji, Huo family, Ji family, Li family, Ma family, Qiang family, Wu family (from Wu Xiefeng), Wutan Baji Quan and Yin Yang Baji Quan. Each has a unique element while sharing core practices. Some lineages are more common or only exist in Mainland China, while others have spread to Western countries.

Mengcun Baji 
Meng Village (Mengcun) is said to be the original birthplace of Baji Quan, or at least the modern versions of the art. Baji is still widely practiced there.

Nanjing Baji 
Baji of Nanjing was introduced to the Guoshu Institute by students of Zhang Jingxing, Han Huiqing, and Ma Yingtu. Han had a great influence on the spread of Baji in southern China, to the point that there was a saying ‘bei li nan han’ meaning ‘Li [Shuwen] in the north and Han [Huachen] in the south’.

Wu Xiufeng 
Wu Xiufeng (1908–1976) is the "grandfather" of many modern Baji lineages. The following lineages descend from him.

Tian-style 
Tian-style is a branch which has mutual influences from Jingang Bashi—the second art practiced by Tian Jinzhong. Practitioners include Wu Xiufeng, Tian Jinzhong, and Shen Jiarui >> Zhou Jingxuan Tian-style is practiced in China and abroad.

Yin-Yang 
Yin-Yang was created by Zhao Fujiang, who combined his knowledge of Baji, Xingyiquan and Yiquan to create a new art form. Yin-Yang is primarily practiced in China.

Wutan Baji 
Wutan Baji is the most common lineage in the West today. Originally from Taiwan, where its founder, Liu Yunqiao, lived. This lineage includes additional arts that are taught alongside Baji, such as Piguaquan and Baguazhang.

Jian Diansheng >> Li Shuwen >> Liu Yunqiao >> Adam Hsu, Su Yuchang, and Tony Yang >> Many students in Taiwan and abroad (taught by one or more of them).

Features

Tactics and strategy 
Baji quan opens the opponent's arms forcibly (qiang kai men ) and mount attacks at high, mid, and low levels of the body (san pan lian ji ). It is most useful in close combat, as it focuses on elbow, knee, shoulder and hip strikes. When blocking an attack or nearing an opponent, baji quan techniques emphasize striking major points of vulnerability, namely the thorax (trunk of the body), legs and neck.

The "six big ways of opening" (liu da kai ) are:

 Ding : using the fist, elbow or shoulder to push forward and upward.
 Bao : putting arms together as if hugging someone. It is usually followed by Pi  (splitting).
 Ti : elevating the knee to hit the thigh of the opponent, or elevating the foot to hit the shin of the opponent, etc.
 Dan : using a single move.
 Kua : using the hip.
 Chan : entanglement with rotation around the wrist, elbow and shoulder.

Stepping and body methods 
Footwork in baji quan has three special features:
 Zhen Jiao
 Nian Bu
 Chuang Bu

These striking techniques are related to traditional Chinese medicine, which states that all parts of the body are connected, either physically or spiritually.

Forms 
The forms of baji are divided into armed and unarmed routines. There are twenty fist forms, which include twelve Baji Small Structure Fists, Baji Black Tiger Fist, Baji Dan Zhai, Baji Dan Da/Dui Da, Baji Luohan Gong, and Baji Si Lang Kuan. There are eight weapons forms, including Liu He Da Qiang (spear), Chun Yang Jian (sword), San Yin Dao (sabre), Xing Zhe Bang (staff), Pudao, and Chun Qiu Da Dao (a long two-handed heavy blade, used by Generals sitting on their horses).

Most schools focus on a much smaller curriculum. Standard across almost all groups are Xiaobaji and Dabaji; two weapons forms, the sabre and the spear; a two-man training routine called Baji Duijie or Baji Duida and a series of 8 short attacking methods called the "Ba Shi" (Eight Postures), which are derived from the art of Shaolin Jingang Bashi.

Power generation and expression 
The major features of baji include elbow strikes, arm/fist punches, hip checks and strikes with the shoulder. All techniques are executed with a short power, developed through training; among Chinese martial artists, baji is known for its fast movements. Baji focuses on infighting, entering from a longer range with a distinctive charging step (zhen jiao).

The essence of baji quan lies in jin, or power-issuing methods, particularly fa jin (explosive power). The style contains six types of jin, eight different ways to hit and several principles of power usage. Most of baji quan's moves utilize a one-hit push-strike method from very close range. The bulk of the damage is dealt through the momentary acceleration that travels up from the waist to the limb and further magnified by the charging step known as zhen jiao.

The mechanics of jin are developed through many years of practice and baji quan is known for its strenuous lower-body training and its emphasis on the horse stance. Its horse stance is higher than that of typical Long Fist styles. Like other styles, there is also "the arrow-bow stance", "the one-leg stance", "the empty stance", "the drop stance", etc. There are eight different hand poses, in addition to different types of breathing and zhen jiao.

Influences 
Baji focuses on being more direct, culminating in powerful, fast strikes that will render an opponent unable to continue. Even so, there are some styles that are derived from Baji's main principles or concepts on how to hit the opponent:
 Eight postures (Ba shi)
 Eight movements method (Ba shi gong)
 Eight movements method (Ba shi chui)
 Double Eight Postures (Shuang ba shi)
 Eight postures of the dragon style (Longxing ba shi)

Many of these forms are also based or mixed with Luohan fist, a Shaolin style. The term ba shi may also refer to baji. The term is also used in xingyi quan.

Notable people
 Li Shuwen
 Liu Yun Qiao
 Adam Hsu - Taiwanese Bajiquan master
 Su Yu-chang
 Li Jianwu
 Wu Lianzhi
 Wu Yue (actor)
 Ryuchi Matsuda - Japanese author behind "A Historical Outline of Chinese Martial Arts" and a manga called Kenji. Matsuda is known for introducing and publicising various Chinese martial arts in Japan, such as Bajiquan.

In popular culture
Bajiquan is a staple in martial arts media, appearing in various movies and video games.

It is featured in the Chinese movie The Grandmaster (2013), performed by character Yixiantian (played by Chang Chen), and Hong Kong drama A Fist Within Four Walls (2016), performed by character Chou Au-kuen (played by Ruco Chan), character Fa Man (played by Grace Wong) and character Duen Ying-fung (played by Benjamin Yuen).

A Taiwanese idol drama Baji Teenagers (一代新兵之八極少年, Yīdài xīnbīng zhī bā jí shàonián) showcases actor Chiu Pin Cheng (alias Leo Chiu).

It is featured in The Matrix film franchise. Smith, played by Hugo Weaving, exhibits basic Bajiquan techniques in the film. Li Mei from Mortal Kombat: Deadly Alliance uses Bajiquan as one of her fighting styles.

It inspired lightningbending used by some firebenders including Zuko, Azula, Iroh, and Mako on he Nickelodeon animated show Avatar: The Last Airbender and its sequel series The Legend of Korra.

It is featured in the Marvel Cinematic Universe. Bajiquan is first used in Shang Chi and the Legend of the Ten Rings as one of the fighting styles of Shang Chi. It is later used in Black Panther: Wakanda Forever by Namor.

Japan
Bajiquan has hugely impacted the Japanese pop culture. In Japanese, it is known as Hakkyokuken, a Japanese reading of the Chinese characters used to write Bajiquan. Bajiquan's impact would begin with Kenji (manga), a manga series written by Ryuchi Matsuda and illustrated by Yoshihide Fujiwara. It follows a teenage practitioner of Bajiquan and is supposedly based on Ryuichi Matsuda's own journey in Chinese martial arts.

In 1993, Yu Suzuki - who got interested in martial arts because of the manga, Kenji - would direct Virtua Fighter, a groundbreaking 3D fighting game. The game was hugely successful in Japan and amongst the roster was a Bajiquan practitioner Akira Yuki, solidifying Bajiquan's stay in Japanese pop-culture. Bajiquan is also central to Yu Suzuki's Shenmue, a "sister" game to Virtua Fighter series.

Bajiquan is featured in many manga/anime series, including Air Master, Gantz, Kenichi: The Mightiest Disciple, Fist of the Blue Sky, Love Hina, Negima! Magister Negi Magi and Beelzebub.

In Japanese video games, it is featured in:
 Virtua Fighter series by Sega, used by Akira Yuki
 Tekken by Namco, mainly used by Leo Kliesen and secondarily by Michelle Chang and Julia Chang
 Street Fighter''' by Capcom, twins Yun and Yang as well as by Karin Kanzuki
 Rival Schools also by Capcom, used by Akira Kazama who also guest stars in Street Fighter V as a DLC character
 Dead or Alive series by Tecmo, used by Kokoro
 Fatal Fury by SNK, used by Tung Fu Rue
 The King of Fighters also by SNK, used by Sie Kensou
 Fighter's History by Data East, used by Lee Diendou
 Tobal 2 by Square, used by Chaco Utani
 Melty Blood and Fate franchise by Type-Moon, used by Miyako Arima in the former, and Kirei Kotomine, Rin Tohsaka, and Li Shuwen in the latter
 Guilty Gear by Arc System Works, used by Jam Kuradoberi
 Judgement and Lost Judgment'' by Sega, used by Takayuki Yagami in his Tiger-fighting style.

See also
 Piguaquan
 Xingyiquan
 Sanda (sport)

Bibliography

References

External links
 Official website of the Wu family BajiQuan
 Bajimen.com - Grandmaster Liu Yun Qiao (archived)
 Website of Master Zhou Jingxuan.
 Hollowfist.com - Essays about Bajiquan's internal theory
 Pachitanglang International - Grandmaster Su Yuchang, disciple of Liu Yunqiao

Chinese martial arts
Chinese swordsmanship